Zethus  is a large crater on Jupiter's moon Thebe. The crater is named after Zethus, the husband of the nymph Thebe in Greek mythology, and is the only named surface feature on Thebe. Zethus, like many other craters on Thebe and Amalthea has bright spots located near its rim. Zethus never faces Jupiter due to being tidally locked to Jupiter in a way that Thebe's long axis points towards Jupiter.

References 

Cited sources

 
 

Thebe (moon)
Impact craters on Jupiter's moons